Sin and Morality (German: Sünde und Moral) is a 1929 German silent film directed by Erich Kober and starring Charlotte Susa.

The film's sets were designed by August Rinaldi.

Cast
In alphabetical order
 Carl Auen 
 Gerhard Dammann 
 Franz Diener
 Hilde Jennings 
 Paul Samson-Körner 
 Charlotte Susa 
 Leopold von Ledebur

References

Bibliography
 Alfred Krautz. International directory of cinematographers, set- and costume designers in film, Volume 4. Saur, 1984.

External links

1929 films
Films of the Weimar Republic
German silent feature films
Films directed by Erich Kober
German black-and-white films